The Envelope Sessions is the second release from Ben Gibbard's solo project ¡All-Time Quarterback!. The tape was a limited release on Elsinor Records and is now out of print. Tracks from this tape were later taken and put together with the ¡All-Time Quarterback! EP and re-released by Barsuk records on the ¡All-Time Quarterback! album. The tracks "Don't Touch the Tape," "Lullaby, Lullaby," "Dig It!" and "Stark Mobile" were excluded from the re-release.

Ben recorded these songs straight to walkman, accompanied only by a toy guitar. The track "Underwater!" went on to become a Death Cab For Cutie song, released on 7" inch as part of the Sub Pop Singles Club in March 2000.

Track listing
 "Don't Touch the Tape"
 "Underwater!"
 "Sock Hop"
 "Lullaby, Lullaby"
 "Dig It!"
 "Cleveland"
 "Stark Mobile"
 "Factory Direct"
 "Empire State"

Credits
Ben Gibbard: Toy guitar, vocals.

The Envelope Sessions were written June 3–5, & 7, 1999 and recorded live onto a Sony Walkman.

¡All-Time Quarterback! EPs
1999 EPs